Bill De Gruchy (30 June 1877 – 29 May 1958) was an Australian rules footballer who played with Geelong in the Victorian Football League (VFL).

His youngest brother, Harold de Gruchy, played one First XVIII match for Melbourne in 1901.

Notes

External links 

1877 births
1958 deaths
Australian rules footballers from Melbourne
Geelong Football Club players
Newtown Football Club players
People from Fitzroy, Victoria